Luzviminda (sometimes LuzViMinda) is a portmanteau of Luzon, Visayas, and Mindanao, the names of the three major island groups of the Philippines. It is a feminine given name. 

It is used by:
 Luzviminda Ilagan, Filipino activist and politician
 Luzviminda Tancangco, Commission on Elections commissioner

References

Filipino feminine given names